The Forty-third Amendment of the Constitution of India, officially known as the Constitution (Forty-third Amendment) Act, 1977, repealed sixarticles that had been inserted into the Constitution by the 42ndAmendment which had been enacted by the Indira Gandhi-led Indian National Congress during the Emergency. The 43rdAmendment was enacted by the newly elected Janata Party which had won the 1977general elections campaigning on a promise to "restore the Constitution to the condition it was in before the Emergency".

Proposal and enactment
The bill of Constitution (Forty-third Amendment) Act, 1977 was introduced in the Lok Sabha on 16December 1977 as the Constitution (Forty-fourth Amendment) Bill, 1977. It was introduced by Shanti Bhushan, Minister of Law, Justice and Company Affairs. The bill sought to amend Articles 145, 228 and 366, and omit Articles 31D, 32A, 131A, 144A, 226A and 228A of the Constitution.

The bill was debated by the Lok Sabha on 19 and 20 December, and was passed on 20December, after adopting a formal amendment to replace the word "Forty-fourth" with "Forty-third" in Clause 1 of the Bill. Subsequently, Clauses 7 to 10 of the Bill were renumbered as 8 to 11 respectively. It was then passed by the Rajya Sabha on 23December 1977. The bill, after ratification by the states, received assent from President Neelam Sanjiva Reddy on 13April 1978. It was notified in The Gazette of India and came into force on the same date.

Ratification
The Act was passed in accordance with the provisions of Article 368 of the Constitution, and was ratified by more than half of the State Legislatures, as required under Clause (2) of the said article. State Legislatures that ratified the amendment are listed below:

Andhra Pradesh
Assam
Bihar
Gujarat
Haryana
Himachal Pradesh
Madhya Pradesh
Maharashtra
Manipur
Meghalaya
Nagaland
Orissa
Punjab
Rajasthan
Sikkim
Tamil Nadu
Tripura
West Bengal
Did not ratify:
 Karnataka
 Jammu and Kashmir
 Kerala
Uttar Pradesh

Constitutional changes
The 43rd Amendment repealed sixarticles31D, 32A, 131A, 144A, 226A and 228Athat had been inserted into the Constitution by the 42ndAmendment. Articles 145, 228 and 366 were amended to facilitate the omission of these six articles.

Article 31D had enabled Parliament to legislate on matters concerning "anti-national activities" and "anti-national associations". Article 32A prohibited the Supreme Court from considering the constitutional validity of State laws in writ proceedings for the enforcement of Fundamental Rights. Article 226A placed a similar prohibition on High Courts from considering the constitutional validity of Central laws. Article 131A barred High Courts making judgements on the constitutional validity of Central legislation, giving exclusive jurisdiction for such laws to the Supreme Court.

Article 144A required that the Supreme Court could only declare a Central or State law as unconstitutional if the decision was made by a bench with at least 7 judges, and backed by a special majority of two-thirds of the bench. Article 228A required that a High Court could only declare a State law as unconstitutional if the decision was made by a bench with at least 5 judges, and backed by a special majority of two-thirds of the bench.

References

43
1977 in India
1977 in law
Desai administration